Jared Gutstadt (born September 19, 1977), also known as Jingle Jared, is a Canadian-born entrepreneur, inventor, and musician best known for founding the creative music agency Jingle Punks (2008), and the scripted-podcast network Audio Up (2020).

Through Jingle Punks, Gustadt acquired and created a catalog of 500,000 songs and a roster of over 1,000 television shows. His collaborators include Bob Dylan, Steven Tyler, Timbaland, Nas, Lil Wayne, Brad Paisley, Miranda Lambert, Machine Gun Kelly, and others.

In 2019, he served as Chief-Collaborator-in Residence for NYU's Tisch School of the Arts, his alma mater. In 2020, Gutstadt received two Adweek awards for Podcast Innovator and Producer of the Year.

His latest venture, Audio Up, specializes in scripted podcasts that feature original music from known and emerging artists. A student of media history, Gutstadt believes that podcasts will serve as “the next great discovery platform.” “I do believe that musicals of the future will evolve from the world of podcasts,” Gutstadt told Rolling Stone.  “The future of entertainment” involves “musical stories built from the ground up.” 

Audio Up's present and future collaborators include Dennis Quaid, Anthony Anderson, Scarlett Burke, Michael Cohen, James Ellroy, and Stephen King.

Early life and education 
Born and raised in Toronto, Gutstadt was a shy child who felt most comfortable when writing songs.  “I was always very distracted, antsy in school. The public school system wasn’t built for my ADHD ways." With the encouragement of a teacher, Jared enrolled in the Media, Information, and Technoculture program at the University of Western Ontario. "In that program, I oscillated between really practical things, like learning how to compose music or edit video, and some really great theoretical stuff. It ended up dictating what the next 10 or 15 years of my life would look like."

In 2000, he moved to New York City to pursue music and attend NYU's Tisch School of the Arts, where he received a master's degree in interactive technology. Jared then worked at Viacom as a video editor on projects such as MTV Cribs and Chappelle’s Show. As a video editor, Gutstadt faced a licensing conundrum: the shows needed music, but using known names proved prohibitively expensive. Gustadt was not satisfied with the royalty-free databases, so he used his own songs.

His bands (The Izzys, Group Sounds) opened for some big names, but he found greater success on the business side of the music industry.I realized I wasn’t going to be a rock star, but at the same time, I started getting royalty checks for some music I worked on for a TV show. It was an "aha!" moment. —Jared GutstadtAfter Chappelle's Show executive producer Neal Brennan discovered that Gutstadt had worked his own music into the edits, Brennan called him a "jingle punk," and the moniker stuck.

Jingle Punks 
In 2008, Gutstadt and Dan Demole co-founded Jingle Punks, a music publishing and licensing company headquartered in New York. With a catalog of nearly 500k songs, it forms one of the largest publishing libraries in the world. Jingle Punks received ASCAP Film & TV Awards in 2010, 2011, 2012, 2013, and 2014 for scoring The Voice, as well as their theme song for Pawn Stars, composed by Gutstadt.

By 2017, it had provided music to more than 1000 TV series, including The Taste, Real Housewives of Atlanta, American Pickers, and Skip and Shannon: Undisputed.

History 
Gutstadt and Demole formed Jingle Punks in 2008 after meeting at a Black Keys concert in Brooklyn. "I told Dan [Demole, Jingle Punks co-founder] if we started a library geared toward youth-oriented networks, things would happen," Gutstadt said.

Within months of launching the company, they released their platform, "The Jingle Player". Developed by Demole with industry knowledge input from Gutstadt, the patented Jingle Player provides targeted music selection with a searchable interface. Company-approved artists can submit their music to the Jingle Player, with the profits split 50-50.

In late 2012, talent agency William Morris Endeavor acquired a majority stake in Jingle Punks, aiming to cultivate synergies across their music and entertainment verticals.

Only two years later, the company was again sold to ole Music Publishing in March 2015. On December 31, 2019, Jared left Jingle Punks to found Audio Up Media.

Hipster Orchestra 
Gutstadt is a founding member of the Jingle Punks-sourced chamber group, The Hipster Orchestra, who have released several albums with orchestral arrangements of Nirvana, The Black Keys, Frank Ocean, and many others. In 2014, The Hipster Orchestra performed with Nas in Johannesburg, South Africa, on the 24th anniversary of the end of Apartheid.

This collaboration resulted when Gutstadt approached Nas after a concert in Cannes. "I have an orchestra," Gutstadt said. "I'm a huge fan. I would love to work with you." Months later they were seated next to each other on a flight to Los Vegas, and the talk resumed. “The way we got there was so wonky, there could never have been a plan,” Gutstadt says. In July 2021, nine digital posters (NFTs) commemorating Nas' performance in South Africa were auctioned with a portion of proceeds benefiting Nile Rodgers' We Are Family Foundation.

Bear and a Banjo 
After collaborating on History Channel's 2016 revision of Roots, Gutstadt and super-producer Jason “Poo Bear” Boyd created a musical podcast Bear and a Banjo, which follows the unlikely duo of Bear (Boyd) and Banjo (Gutstadt), who are placed in pivotal moments of American musical history à la the 1994 film Forrest Gump.

In what narrator Dennis Quaid describes as “a true fiction of American music,” Bear and Banjo stumble upon the wrongful conviction of Lead Belly, an ill-fated card game with Sonny Liston, the wedding of Sister Rosetta Tharpe, the birth of the CIA, and a young Bob Dylan at a softball game. The accompanying album was produced by T Bone Burnett with a contribution from Dylan with whom Burnett played guitar in the 1970s.

Bear and a Banjo, "the first musical narrative within the podcast medium" harkens back to the early days of radio "when the whole family would sit around the radio and imagine together," Quaid says. Each episode ends with a song from Bear and a Banjo, "a fake band" playing new old songs steeped in Americana. The accompanying album was produced by T Bone Burnett with a contribution from Dylan with whom Burnett played guitar in the 1970s.

According to Billboard, "The renowned songwriter [Poo Bear] doesn’t get much time in front of the mic, but when he does, his spectacular vocal range is shown through songs like the blues-folk fusion track 'Can You Hear Me Now?'”

For Gutstadt, who plays Bear's trickster sidekick, the project represented a new creative form: "musical stories built from the ground up.”

After a presentation at SXSW, the podcast was picked up by iHeart Radio and released in October 2019.

Audio Up Media 
In 2020, Gutstadt founded Audio Up Media, a production studio and platform for podcasts which Gutstadt imagines as “an HBO for your ears.”

In May 2020, after several months of self-funding, Audio Up received a 4.5 million-dollar investment from MGM Studios which includes a first-look deal at adaptations.  Audio Up's “rich-scripted narratives and first-class documentaries,” MGM's President of Television Operations Brian Edwards believes, “will inspire new ideas in both the feature and series mediums.”

With offices in Los Angeles and Nashville, Audio Up plans to produce at least 40 podcasts a year that it will develop into IP."We create all of our content and we own a whole lot of our IP instead of relying on other people bringing us their content."

The pandemic accelerated both research and development. “Every star that I could ever imagine working with became suddenly available, from my first projects being with Miranda Lambert, 24Kgoldn, Machine Gun Kelly, Iann Dior. These are people that normally would have been touring, or maybe giving us the Hollywood shuffle”

Current shows

Make It Up as We Go 
Make It Up As We Go follows the story of aspiring young songwriter, played by Scarlett Burke, who moves to Nashville to chase her country music dreams.

Burke herself had moved to Nashville with a songbook, but was reluctant to tour. Gutstadt suggested that they record her songs and then form a narrative around her experiences in Nashville's writers' rooms. A dramatized version of her own story would form the basis of the podcast. In November 2020, the fiction became fact when Miranda Lambert recorded "Champion," a song that Burke had written for Make It Up As We Go.“The goal of the podcast is breaking a big old song; that’s what I do every day. This is just another outlet for that.” —Bobby Bones, executive producerWritten by David Hudgins (Friday Night Lights, Parenthood, and Game of Silence) and Brooks Hudgins, Make It Up As We Go's cast also includes Billy Bob Thornton, Dennis Quaid, Craig Robinson and Bobby Bones.  Lindsay Ell and Miranda Lambert make appearances as themselves in addition to contributing original music.

A Webby Award nominee, the show received a 4.8-star review on Apple Podcasts and over one million streams, before it was green-lighted for a second season.

Halloween in Hell 
The four-part series, released in October 2020, features Machine Gun Kelly, 24kGoldn, Dana Dentata, iann dior and phem playing fictional characters of themselves competing in the “most evil singing game show of all time” with Tommy Lee appearing as Satan, and Keegan-Michael Key as the haunted mansion's caretaker. According to Kelly, “Jared [Gutstadt] came with the whole vision and script. I just lent my voice.” The podcast amassed over one million streams in its four-week run.

Sonic Leap 
Sonic Leap continues Audio Up's goal of artist discovery through Hero the Band, four brothers from Atlanta who cross styles and genres.

Sonic Leap invents a fake origin story for the band—a storyline, reminiscent of Back to the Future—in which the brothers, steeped in 80s new wave artists, meet a time-traveling guru (played by Anthony Anderson of Black-ish fame) who sends them back to 1985 where they can earn their proper stardom.

"2020 should have been an epic year for the band," Gutstadt says, "with opportunities to be part of major festivals, touring globally, and having people discover their music — but with Covid-19, we are now leaning into the idea of an origin story in the form of a fictional podcast. The podcast is about a band that believes they’ve ‘arrived’ at the wrong time in history. So we turned back the clock in Sonic Leap, and sent them to the feel-good 1980s."

The show was conceived by Gutstadt and written by Zach Selwyn for a summer 2021 release.

Uncle Drank: the Totally Hammered Podcast 
The 8-part comedy music special will feature Gary Busey as Uncle Drank, a free-spirited beach musician, "one-part Kenny Chesney and one-part Kenny Powers," a fictional superstar who is "widely known as the inventor of beach-country and trop rock."

Dennis Quaid plays Blendy, Uncle Drank's best friend (and blender). "Uncle Drank is truly an offshoot of Gary’s personality," Quaid says. "When we pitched it to him, he said that no acting would be required. Many people don’t know this, but Gary was a musician first. He played with Leon Russell as his drummer, he was friends with Waylon Jennings and people like T Bone Burnett, plus he wrote music for Robert Altman’s iconic Nashville."

Gutstadt wrote the music, which will include performances by Trinidad James, Luke Wilson, and others.

Hollywood Death Trip 
Hollywood Death Trip stars famed crime-fiction writer James Ellroy (L.A. Confidential, The Black Dahlia) narrating his own true-life crime reporting of memorable midcentury murders.

The podcast series is set to launch in August 2021.

Strawberry Spring 
Stephen King has partnered with Audio Up Media, iHeart Media, and producer Lee Metzger (The Voice) to create Strawberry Spring, a new show based on a tale from his 1978 short story collection Night Shift.
The series follows a journalist as he hunts for a serial killer named Springheel Jack. Metzger will write and direct, while the show will star Garrett Hedlund, Milo Ventimiglia, Herizen F. Guardiola, Sydney Sweeney, Ken Marino, and Al Madrigal. Philip Alberstat will produce.

Discography
 The Izzys, The Izzys (2004)
 The Izzys, Fast and Out of Control Wins the Race (2005)
 Group Sounds, EP (2005)
 Group Sounds, Group Sounds (2006)
 The Hipster Orchestra, Hipster Dinner Party, Vol. 1 (2011)
 The Hipster Orchestra, The Nirvana Sessions (2011)
 The Hipster Orchestra, King of Instruments (2012) (w/ Alex Collier)
 The Hipster Orchestra, "Mirrors" (2013)
 The Hipster Orchestra, The In Utero Sessions (2013)

References

External links
 Jared Gutstadt's musical collaborations
 Jared Gutstadt's TEDx Talk

American music industry executives
1977 births
Living people
People from Toronto